Gary Beck (born 1941) is a drag racing driver.

Gary Beck may also refer to:

Gary Beck (fictional character), in City Homicide (series 4)
Gary Beck (producer), techno producer, see RockNess 2010
Gary Beck (RAAF officer), see List of Royal Australian Air Force air marshals